Sancak is a town (belde) in Bingöl District, Bingöl Province, Turkey. The town is populated by Kurds of the Bekiran, Reman and Şadiyan tribes and had a population of 2,412 in 2021.

The settlements of Akbudak, Büyükbaşköy, Çimenli, Hoşkar, Karapınar, Küçükbaşköy, Sarıgümüş and Yeşilova are attached to Sancak.

References

Towns in Turkey
Populated places in Bingöl District

Kurdish settlements in Bingöl Province